West Greene, also known as Boston, Hopewell, Old West Greene, and Westgreene, is an unincorporated community in Greene County, Alabama, United States. It lies at an elevation of 164 feet (50 m). The post office in West Greene first opened in 1879.

References

Unincorporated communities in Greene County, Alabama
Unincorporated communities in Alabama